Grace Wanjiru Njue (born 1979) is a female race walker from Kenya. She is a three-time African Champion and a Commonwealth Games medallist.

Wanjiru set a 20 Kilometres race walk African Record when she won the event at the 2010 African Championships clocking 1:34:19 hours. The previous record (1:36:18) was held by Susan Vermeulen of South Africa and set in 1999. Wanjiru was already the reigning Kenyan record (time 1:39.50) holder, setting it when she won the  2008 African Championships title. Previously in 2004, she had set a new 20 kilometres national record (1:41:00) in Nairobi.

Later in 2010 she won bronze medal at the 2010 Commonwealth Games.

She is also a multiple-time national champion. In 2011, she won 20 kilometres race walk at the national championships once again setting another African record of 1:28:15

Achievements

References

External links

1979 births
Kenyan female racewalkers
Living people
People from Embu County
Athletes (track and field) at the 2010 Commonwealth Games
Athletes (track and field) at the 2015 African Games
Athletes (track and field) at the 2016 Summer Olympics
Athletes (track and field) at the 2019 African Games
Olympic athletes of Kenya
Commonwealth Games medallists in athletics
Commonwealth Games bronze medallists for Kenya
African Games gold medalists for Kenya
African Games medalists in athletics (track and field)
Medallists at the 2010 Commonwealth Games